Gration may refer to:

 Gration, one of the Giants in Greek mythology
 Harry Gration (1950–2022), television presenter
 Peter Gration (born 1932), army officer
 Scott Gration, U.S. diplomat and retired Air Force officer